Thomas Laranjeira (born 5 May 1992) is a French rugby union player. His position is either Fly-half or Fullback and he currently plays for Brive in the Top 14.

References

External links
CA Brive profile
L'Équipe profile

1992 births
Living people
Sportspeople from Rhône (department)
French rugby union players
French people of Portuguese descent
CA Brive players
Rugby union fly-halves
Rugby union fullbacks